N'Gama N'Gama (sometimes listed as N'Gama, born October 11, 1947) is an Ivorian sprint canoer who competed from the late 1960s to the mid-1980s. He was eliminated in the semifinals of the K-2 1000 m event at the 1968 Summer Olympics in Mexico City. Four years later in Munich, N'Gama was eliminated in the semifinals of the K-1 1000 m event. At his third and final Summer Olympics in Los Angeles, he was eliminated in the repechages of the K-1 500 m event.

External links
Sports-reference.com profile

1947 births
Canoeists at the 1968 Summer Olympics
Canoeists at the 1972 Summer Olympics
Canoeists at the 1984 Summer Olympics
Ivorian male canoeists
Living people
Olympic canoeists of Ivory Coast